Roter Veltliner is a grape variety used to make white wine. It is found in Austria. Some of the better wines come from the Wagram district of Donauland.

Varieties
It is believed to be a very old variety, but its parentage has so far not been possible to determine. There are however several other varieties which are the offspring of Roter Veltliner, such as:
 Frühroter Veltliner, a cross with Silvaner
 Neuburger, another cross with Silvaner
 Rotgipfler, a cross with Traminer
 Zierfandler, possibly a cross with Traminer

Despite its name Roter Veltliner is not related to Grüner Veltliner. It was previously believed that Roter Veltliner could be a grandparent to Grüner Veltliner, but that hypothesis seems to have lost credibility with later studies.

Synonyms 
Roter Veltliner is also known under the synonyms: 

  Ariavina
  Ariavina Männliche
  Bakor
  Belo Ocka
  Belo Oka
  Buzyn
  Cerveny Muskatel
  Crvena Valtelina
  Crvena Valtelinka
  Csucsos Bakor
  Debela Ariavina
  Dreimänner
  Erdezha
  Erdezha Shopatna
  Erdezka Rabolina
  Fedleiner
  Feldleiner
  Feldleiner Rothlichter
  Feldliner
  Feldlinger
  Feltliner
  Fleisch Roter Velteliner
  Fleisch Roter Wälteliner
  Fleisch Traminer
  Fleischroter Traminer
  Fleischrother Velteliner
  Fleischrother Veltliner
  Fleischtraminer
  Fleischtraube
  Fleischtraube Rot
  Fleischweiner
  Grosbrauner Velteliner
  Grossbrauner
  Grosse Fleischtraube
  Grosser Fleischtraube
  Grosser Roter Veltliner
  Grosser Rother Välteliner
  Grosser Rother Veltliner
  Grosser Traminer
  Grosser Välteliner
  Grosser Velteliner
  Grosswiener
  Herera Rhaetica
  Herera Valtellina
  Kecskecsecs
  Krdeca
  Männliche Ariavina
  Mannliche
  Maucnjk
  Mavcnik
  Mavenick
  Mavenik
  Moseavina
  Moslavina
  Muscateller
  Muskatel Cerveny
  Nagy Veltelini
  Nagysagos
  Nyulsölö
  Nyulszölö
  Piros Veltelini
  Pirosveltelin
  Pirosveltelini
  Rabolina
  Raifler
  Raisin de Saint Valentin
  Ranfler
  Ranfolica
  Ranfolina
  Ranfoliza
  Raufler
  Raufolica
  Rebalina
  Rebolina
  Red Veltliner
  Reifler
  Rhaetica
  Riegersburger Rothköpfel
  Riegersburger Rothtöpfel
  Rivola Tchervena
  Rossera
  Rossola
  Rote Fleisch Traube
  Rote Fleischtraube
  Rote Fleischtrauble
  Roter
  Roter Muskateller
  Roter Riesling
  Roter Välteliner
  Roter Velteliner
  Roter Veltiner
  Roter Veltliner
  Rotgipfler
  Rothe Shopatna
  Rothe Shopotna
  Rothe Velteliner
  Rother Fleischtraube
  Rother Muscateller
  Rother Raifler
  Rother Riesling
  Rother Välteliner
  Rother Velteliner
  Rother Veltliner
  Rother Zierfahnler
  Rothgipfler
  Rothlichter
  Rothreifler
  Rotmehlweisser
  Rotmuskateller
  Rotreifler
  Rudeca
  Ryvola Cervena
  Ryvola Crvena
  Saint Valentin Rose
  Saint Valentinrose
  Shopatna
  Shopotna
  Somsölö
  Spaete Ranfoliza
  St. Valentin
  Tarant Cerveny
  Tarant Rot
  Todtraeger Rotreifler
  Traminer
  Uva di San Valentino
  Valentin
  Valentin Rouge
  Välteliner
  Välteliner Roter
  Valtelin Rouge
  Valteliner
  Vältliner
  Valteliner Rosso
  Valteliner Rouge
  Valteliner Tardif
  Veltelin Piros
  Veltelin Rosso
  Velteline Rouge
  Velteliner
  Velteliner Rose
  Velteliner Roso
  Velteliner Roter
  Velteliner Rother
  Velteliner Rouge
  Veltelini Piros
  Veltlinac Crveni
  Veltliner
  Veltliner Rosso
  Veltliner Rot Weiss
  Veltliner Roth
  Veltliner Rother
  Veltliner Rouge
  Veltlini Piros
  Veltlinske Cervene
  Veltlinski Rozovii
  Veltlinskii Rozovii
  Veltlinsky Rosovy
  Vernyeges Veltelini
  Verrnyeges Veltelini
  Weisser Raifler
  Weissholzige Ribula Maucnjk
  and Ziegelroth

See also
 Austrian wine

References

White wine grape varieties
Austrian wine